Modern Vices are an American rock band from Chicago, Illinois.

History
Modern Vices began in 2013. The members all dropped out of college to pursue music full-time. In 2014, Modern Vices released their self-titled debut album in October 2014. In 2017, Modern Vices released a new song titled "If Only". In 2019, Modern Vices released a new song titled "All You Got'. In 2019, Modern Vices released a new song titled "Not a Problem'. 
In 2019, Modern Vices released their second album in October 2019.

Band members
Alex Rebek (vocals)
Patrick Hennessey (drums)
Peter Scoville (guitar) 
Thomas Peters (guitar)
Miles Kalchik (bass)

Discography
Studio albums
Modern Vices (2014, Autumn Tone Records)
If Only (2019, Modern Vices)

References

Alternative rock groups from Illinois
Musical groups established in 2013
Rock music groups from Illinois
Musical groups from Chicago
2013 establishments in Illinois